Kelman's source characteristics identify three characteristics of successful marketing communications sources:

 source credibility
 source attractiveness
 source power.

Source attractiveness

An attractive source is one that the receiver can identify with, or aspire to. The message from such as source is identified with by the receiver; e.g. "slice of life" advertising, for products such as washing powder, regularly feature actors in situations that are intended to reflect the lives of the target segment.

Source power

A powerful source is intended to bring about compliance in the receiver. An example would be a police officer giving an anti-drink drive message.

Promotion and marketing communications